Michael Winstanley Mansbridge (1932-2014) was a British Anglican priest who was Archdeacon in Cyprus from 1983 to 1999.

He was Chaplain of the University of Nairobi from 1962 to 1965; Vicar of Chilvers Coton from 1965-to 1975 (Rural Dean of Nuneaton, 1967-1974); Vicar of Holy Trinity, Leamington from 1975 to 1988 before his appointment as Archdeacon.

References

1932 births
2014 deaths
20th-century English Anglican priests
Archdeacons of Cyprus